Stand by Me is a gospel album by American country singer Ernest Tubb, released in 1966 (see 1966 in music).

Track listing
 "When Jesus Calls" (Willie Phelps)
 "The Old Rugged Cross" (George Bennard)
 "When I Take My Vacation in Heaven" (Herbert Buffum, R.E. Winsett)
 "Farther Along" (Traditional)
 "May the Good Lord Bless and Keep You" (Meredith Willson)
 "Stand by Me" (Charles Albert Tindley)
 "I Met a Friend" (Charles Fay Smith)
 "When It's Prayer Meeting Time in the Hollow" (Al Rice, Fleming Allan)
 "The Wonderful City" (Elsie McWilliams, Jimmie Rodgers)
 "What a Friend We Have in Jesus" (Charles Crozat Converse, Joseph M. Scriven)

References

Ernest Tubb albums
1966 albums
Vocalion Records albums